Yindu may refer to:

Yindu District, in Anyang, Henan, China
Yindu Chin, or Dai, an ethnic tribe of Chin, Myanmar
, the Hanyu Pinyin transliteration of the Chinese name for modern India